Lotte Vestergaard (born 18 July 1997) is a Danish handball player who currently plays for Skanderborg Håndbold.

On 12 April 2020, it was announced that she had signed a 2-year contract with Skanderborg Håndbold, from Hadsten Håndbold.

Achievements 
Danish Cup:
Winner: 2016

References

1997 births
Living people
Danish female handball players
People from Vesthimmerland Municipality
Sportspeople from the North Jutland Region